Kooringal could refer to:
 Kooringal, Queensland in Brisbane, Australia
 Kooringal, New South Wales in Wagga Wagga, Australia